Hemmingsen is a Danish surname. Notable people with the surname include:

Carsten Hemmingsen (born 1970), Danish footballer and manager
Michael Hemmingsen (born 1967), Danish footballer and manager
Niels Hemmingsen (1513–1600), Danish Lutheran theologian
Steve Hemmingsen, American television journalist

See also
Mount Hemmingsen, mountain of Antarctica

Danish-language surnames